People's Freedom Movement can refer to:

People's Freedom Movement (Jamaica)
People's Freedom Movement (Serbia)